Langford station is a station located on the Island Corridor Foundation in Langford, British Columbia, Canada. The station was on Via Rail's Dayliner service, which has been indefinitely suspended since 2011.

References

External links 
Via Rail Station Description

Via Rail stations in British Columbia
Disused railway stations in Canada